"Hold Me" is a song performed by Finnish singer Sandhja. The song was released as a digital download on 15 November 2013 through Sony Music Entertainment Finland as the lead single from her debut studio album Gold (2014). The song peaked at number 12 on the Finnish Airplay Chart.

Music video
A music video to accompany the release of "Hold Me" was first released onto YouTube on 15 November 2013 at a total length of three minutes and fifty seconds. The video was directed by Ville Nuoraho.

Track listing

Chart performance

Release history

References

2013 songs
2013 debut singles
Sandhja songs